Events from the year 1933 in Italy.

Incumbents 

 King: Victor Emmanuel III.
 Prime Minister: Benito Mussolini

Events 

 January 1:

Births
4 March: John Ciaccia, Italian-Canadian politician (died 2018)
24 June: Mariano Antonelli, sports shooter
26 June: Claudio Abbado, conductor (died 2014)
29 June: Piero Barucci, academic

Deaths
 January 10  – Roberto Mantovani, geologist (born 1854)
 March 14 – Antonio Garbasso, physicist, politician (born 1871)
 March 18 – Prince Luigi Amedeo, Duke of the Abruzzi, mountaineer, explorer and admiral (born 1873)
 September 2 – Francesco de Pinedo, aviator (born 1890)
 September 10 – Giuseppe Campari, opera singer, Grand Prix driver (born 1892)
 November 27 – Cesare Nava, engineer and politician

References 

 
1930s in Italy
Years of the 20th century in Italy